Long John's Blues was the début solo album by British blues singer Long John Baldry and his band, the Hoochie Coochie Men, featuring musicians who had previously played alongside Baldry in the Cyril Davies All-Stars. The album featured a track list that he would continue to play at live shows throughout his career.

In 1995 Long John's Blues / Looking at Long John was released on CD. It has since been re-released and remastered on Looking at Long John: The UA Years. The album had a vinyl reissue in 2009.

Track listing 

 "I Got My Mojo Workin'" (Preston Foster) – 3:13
 "Gee Baby Ain't I Good to You" (Don Redman, Andy Razaf) – 3:57
 "Roll 'Em Pete" (Pete Johnson) – 3:32
 "You're Breaking My Heart" (B.B. King, Joe Josea) – 4:36
 "Hoochie Coochie Man" (Willie Dixon) – 3:50
 "Everyday (I Have the Blues)" (Peter Chatman) – 3:04
 "Dimples" (John Lee Hooker) – 2:22
 "Five Long Years" (Eddie Boyd) – 5:11
 "My Babe" (Dixon) – 2:36
 "Times Are Getting Tougher Than Tough" (Jimmy Witherspoon) – 2:28
 "Goin' Down Slow" (James Burke Oden) – 3:57
 "Rock the Joint" (John Baldry) – 3:53

Personnel 
 Long John Baldry – vocals, guitar
The Hoochie Coochie Men
 Cliff Barton – bass guitar
 Bill Law – drums
 Geoff Bradford – guitar, harmonica
 Ian Armit – piano
Technical
 Ron Belchier – producer
 Martin Davis – producer (track 6)
 Jack Good – producer (track 7)
 Norman Seeff – art direction
 John Van Hamersveld – album cover design

Original Album 

This album features many of the musicians from the Hoochie Coochie Men, Baldry's band at the time, although, for contractual reasons, Rod Stewart is notably absent. It includes songs such as "Got My Mojo Working," "Goin' Down Slow" and "Everyday I Have the Blues," which became staples of Baldry's live shows throughout his career. Released on CD in 2006.

Long John's Blues 1971 

Baldry's 1964 album for United Artists was reissued for America with a gatefold sleeve showing photos and clippings from the era. The bonus on this record is the inclusion of Baldry's duet with Rod Stewart on Sister Rosetta Tharpe's "Up Above My Head," the B-side to Baldry's 1964 single "You'll Be Mine."

Track listing 

 "Rock The Joint" (Long John Baldry) – 3:53
 "Times Are Getting Tougher Than Tough" (Jimmy Witherspoon) – 2:28
 "I Got My Mojo Workin'" (Preston Foster) – 3:13
 "Everyday (I Have The Blues)" (Peter Chatman) – 3:04
 "You're Breaking My Heart" – 4:36
 "Bring My Baby Back to Me" (Baldry) – 3:25
 "Up Above My Head (There's Music in the Air)" (Sister Rosetta Tharpe) – 2:48
 "Dimples" (John Lee Hooker) – 2:22
 "Five Long Years" (Eddie Boyd) – 5:11
 "Gee Baby, Ain't I Good to You?" (Don Redman, Andy Razaf) – 3:57
 "Goin' Down Slow" (James Burke Oden) – 3:57
 "Roll 'Em Pete" (Pete Johnson) – 3:32

References 

1964 debut albums
United Artists Records albums
Long John Baldry albums
Albums recorded at IBC Studios